St. Luke's Episcopal Church is located at 615 Vermillion Street in historic downtown Hastings, Minnesota, United States.

History
St Luke's Episcopal Church is the fifth oldest church in the diocese and was organized as a mission, established in 1850 by the Reverend Jackson Kemper, the Episcopal Bishop of the entire Northwest Territories. The first Episcopal Bishop in the Minnesota Territory was Bishop Henry Whipple, serving from 1859 – 1901. Bishop Whipple worked to provide proper treatment and justice for the Native Americans, and was known as “Straight Tongue” to all nations. He was allowed to pass unharmed throughout the territory, even through scenes of battle. St. Luke's Episcopal Church was the only church in town that permitted Native and African Americans to their worship services. "Indian Joe", who was a friend to whites, alerted Hastings residents of impending attacks, and is buried in St. Luke's Cemetery.

The first worship service was held on January 7, 1855, in the dining room of the Dakota House on 2nd and Sibley Streets in downtown Hastings. In 1856, the cornerstone was laid for St. Luke's first church building on May 6, by the Reverend Jackson Kemper, and was opened for regular worship on November 16 of the same year. In 1857, the church building was consecrated, and the first rector, Reverend Timothy Wilcoxson held services every other Sunday. He walked regularly from Saint Paul to Hastings and other surrounding communities he was serving. Church pews built of butternut wood were installed in 1867, and are still used today. Two small matching pews are found in the chapel of the LeDuc Mansion in Hastings. Two of General William LeDuc's daughters taught Sunday school at St. Luke's Episcopal, and the family is referenced many times in the church's historical records. In 1868, the altar cross, candlesticks, vases, and communion silver were given to the church, and have been in use ever since.

Reconstruction

In 1880, the original church building was destroyed by fire on Christmas Eve when the candles on the Christmas tree ignited the chancel window. All of the furnishings, the pews, and the altar were saved and moved into the new building, which was finished in 1881 at a cost of $7,759.50. This building is St. Luke's Episcopal Church's current place of worship. In 1882, the “Good Shepherd Window” was installed above the altar at a cost of $250.00. This stained glass window boasts actual enamel work on the face, hands, and feet of Christ, and is considered irreplaceable in its original condition because of the rarity of this kind of work in modern times. The Bishop's Chair, of high significance in the Episcopal religion, was also given in 1882, and was first used by Bishop Whipple when he confirmed a class in May of that year.
Other significant pieces that were given in the 1800s, and are still in use, include the other stained glass windows (dates unavailable), dedicated by prominent names from the earliest history of Hastings, MN, and the eagle lectern (1887). In 1892, the gas lamps in the church were replaced with electric lights, and in 1902, the new pulpit was given by parishioners.

Current Status
Since the 1950s, there have been functional additions to the building, along with the modern conveniences of air conditioning, an elevator, and sound system, but, aside from normal upkeep, the sanctuary remains original to its completion in 1881.

References

External links
 St. Luke's Episcopal Church website

Buildings and structures in Hastings, Minnesota
Churches in Dakota County, Minnesota
Episcopal church buildings in Minnesota